Happy Days, Sweetheart is the 1993 debut and only album by the rock band Ethyl Meatplow. The album was released on Chameleon Records, distributed by Elektra Entertainment and produced by Barry Adamson. The album received praise by many critics but did not fare very well commercially.

The video for "Devil's Johnson" was featured on an episode of Beavis & Butt-head.

Track listing
"Opening Precautionary Instructions" - 0:44
"Suck" - 4:08
"Devil's Johnson" - 3:13
"Car" - 2:26
"Queenie" - 3:35
"(They Long to Be) Close to You" - 3:29
"Tommy" - 4:36
"Mustard Requiem" - 1:44
"Abazab" - 4:27
"Ripened Peach" - 4:30
"Feed" - 5:25
"Rise" - 4:53
"For My Sleepy Lover" - 0:51
"Sad Bear" - 5:06
"Untitled" - 6:18

Chart positions
Singles

Personnel
Barry Adamson - Producer, Additional Vocals (Tracks 2, 9 & 14)
David Brown - Alto Sax (Track 2)
Carla Bozulich - Vocals, Trumpet
Chris Fuhrman - Engineering
Sayuri Kawada - Violin
Daniel Keenan - Additional Vocals (Tracks 2)
Eeda Kitto - Violin
John Napier - Drums
Harold Barefoot Sanders - Vocals, Guitar
Albert Wing - Tenor Sax (Track 2)

References

1993 debut albums
Ethyl Meatplow albums